Laurence Senelick is an American scholar, educator, actor and director. He is the author, editor, or translator of many books.

Teaching
Senelick joined the Department of Drama at Tufts University in 1972, where he was later named Fletcher Professor of Oratory and served as Director of Graduate Studies for 30 years.  He retired in 2019.

Scholarship
Senelick's scholarship has focused on popular entertainment, with research into music hall, vaudeville, circus and pantomime. His work on Russian and Soviet theater was honored by the St. George Medal of the Russian Ministry of Culture. His writings also studied gender in performance, culminating in The Changing Room: Sex, Drag and Theatre (2000).

Theater
Senelick has directed productions for many groups, including the Opera Company of Boston, Boston Baroque, the Loeb Drama Center, and the Purcell Society. His productions include the US premieres of the Seneca the Younger/Ted Hughes' Oedipus, Robert David MacDonald’s Summit Conference, and Pedro Miguel Rozos’ Our Private Life.  As an actor, he performed Samuel Beckett’s Krapp’s Last Tape when he was 73. He serves on the Board of Directors of the Poets Theatre.

Awards
Senelick's work in the classroom has been honored with the Oscar Brockett Outstanding Teacher of Theatre in Higher Education Award of the Association for Theatre in Higher Education and the Betty Jean Jones Award of the American Theatre and Drama Society as Outstanding Teacher of American Theatre and Drama.
His books have received prizes such as the Barnard Hewitt Award of the American Society for Theatre Research, the George Freedley Award of the Theatre Library Association, and the George Jean Nathan Award for Dramatic Criticism.  
His research has been recognized by grants from the Guggenheim Foundation and he has been named a Fellow of the American Academy of Arts and Sciences, the College of Fellows of the American Theatre, and the Berlin Institute for Advanced Studies

Personal life
Laurence Senelick's brother is the neurologist and author Dr. Richard Senelick. Senelick’s life partner was the novelist and screenwriter Michael McDowell; they were together for 30 years until McDowell’s death in 1999.

Selected bibliography

As author

As editor or translator
Editor and translator (with Sergei Ostrovsky), 
Editor and translator, 
Editor, 
Editor, 
Editor, 
Editor, 
Editor, 
Editor and translator, 
Editor, 
Editor and translator, 
Editor and translator,

References 

Tufts University faculty
Northwestern University alumni
Harvard University alumni
Theatrologists
Living people
1942 births